Sifiso Vilakazi (born 11 September 1979 in South Africa) is a South African retired footballer.

Career

While playing for Bidvest Wits, Vilakazi received an offer from Orlando Pirates, one of the most successful teams in South Africa, but declined it due to his age and also because he wanted to retire at Bidvest Wits, a decision he later regretted. Instead, Vilakazi moved to AmaZulu, but regretted it after playing less than he expected, despite earning more money.

References

External links
 Sifiso Vilakazi at Soccerway

South African soccer players
Living people
Association football forwards
1979 births
Bidvest Wits F.C. players
Cape Town Spurs F.C. players
AmaZulu F.C. players
Royal Eagles F.C. players